The men's qualification for football tournament at the 1996 Summer Olympics.

Qualifications
The following 16 teams qualified for the 1996 Olympic men's football tournament:

External links
Football Qualifying Tournament (Atlanta, USA, 1996) - Rec.Sport.Soccer Statistics Foundation